SUSE is a German-based multinational open-source software company that develops and sells Linux products to business customers. Founded in 1992, it was the first company to market Linux for enterprise. It is the developer of SUSE Linux Enterprise and the primary sponsor of the community-supported openSUSE Linux distribution project. While the openSUSE "Tumbleweed" variation is an upstream distribution for both the "Leap" variation and SUSE Linux Enterprise distribution, its branded "Leap" variation is part of a direct upgrade path to the enterprise version, which effectively makes openSUSE Leap a non-commercial version of its enterprise product.

In July 2018, Micro Focus International, SUSE's parent company since 2014, announced its plan to sell the business unit to a subsidiary of EQT Partners in the first quarter of calendar year 2019. This acquisition was completed on 15 March 2019, making SUSE a standalone business. Under new ownership, their legal name is SUSE Software Solutions Germany GmbH.

History
On 2 September 1992, Roland Dyroff, Burchard Steinbild, Hubert Mantel and Thomas Fehr founded the Software and Systems Development Corporation. The name S.u.S.E. was an acronym for Software- und System-Entwicklung (Software and Systems Development). The name alludes to the inventor of the first computer, Konrad Zuse. The first Linux product sold was an extension of the Linux distribution Slackware, which was delivered on 40 floppy disks. The company translated the distribution in cooperation with the Slackware founder Patrick Volkerding into German. While the core of the distribution remained Slackware, in May 1996, S.u.S.E. released its first own distribution based on the Jurix distribution published by Florian La Roche.

In 1997, S.u.S.E. opened an office in Oakland, California, and in 1998, moved the corporate office from Fürth to Nürnberg. In December 1998, the name was changed from S.u.S.E. to SuSE. In the following years, SUSE opened a total of six national and four international (USA, Czech Republic, Great Britain and Italy) branches. On 25 November 2002, Richard Seibt became CEO. In Hong Kong, SUSE's products are distributed by TriTech Distribution Limited.

Acquisition by Novell
Novell had been migrating away from the NetWare kernel and used this acquisition as a migration path for its customers. The acquisition was completed on 13 January 2004, and the name was changed from SuSE Linux AG to a Novell, Inc. subsidiary under the name SuSE Linux GmbH and SUSE Linux Products GmbH. SUSE Linux Products GmbH was entirely responsible for the development of the SUSE Linux distribution and was led by Markus Rex. During the transfer, both the partner and the sales organizations were integrated into Novell. Richard Seibt became CEO of Novell EMEA and left on 9 May 2005.

In August 2005, the openSUSE community project launched to open up the development of SUSE Linux for external users and developers. SUSE Linux Enterprise has since been developed using the openSUSE community.

Acquisition by Attachmate
Novell was in turn acquired by The Attachmate Group on 27 April 2011. Under its new owner, SUSE remained a separate company. By June 2012, many former SUSE engineers who had been laid off during Novell's ownership had been brought back.

Attachmate and Micro Focus merger
On 20 November 2014, The Attachmate Group and Micro Focus International finalized their merger, making Micro Focus International SUSE's new parent company. SUSE operates as a semi-autonomous business unit within the Micro Focus Group, with former president Nils Brauckmann promoted to CEO and member of the Micro Focus Group board.

Acquisition of OpenAttic

On 9 November 2016, SUSE announced the acquisition of assets relating to the OpenAttic storage management assets from the German IT firm it-novum. OpenAttic was integrated into SUSE Enterprise Storage as a graphical tool to manage and monitor Ceph-based storage clusters.

Acquisition of HPE OpenStack and Stackato
On 9 March 2017, SUSE announced the completion of its acquisition of assets relating to the OpenStack and Cloud Foundry products from Hewlett Packard Enterprise (HPE). Development teams and code related to those products were to be used to expand SUSE's IaaS and PaaS capabilities. As part of the agreement, HPE was given the option to OEM those products to produce their Helion OpenStack and Stackato products.

Sale to EQT Partners
On 2 July 2018, Micro Focus announced that it would sell its SUSE business segment to Blitz 18-679 GmbH, a newly-created subsidiary of EQT Partners, for $2.535 billion. On 15 March 2019, SUSE announced the completion of the acquisition. Blitz 18-679 GmbH later adopted the name Marcel BidCo GmbH and is currently an ultimate parent of SUSE Software Solutions Germany GmbH, which continued operations of SUSE LINUX GmbH, a company dissolved on 28 August 2019.

On 22 July 2019, Melissa Di Donato, former SAP COO, was appointed CEO of SUSE.

Acquisition of Rancher Labs
On 8 July 2020, SUSE announced its definitive agreement to acquire Rancher Labs, which provides a Kubernetes management platform. The acquisition closed on 1 December 2020, at which time Rancher CEO and cofounder Sheng Liang became SUSE's President of Engineering and Innovation.

Initial public offering
Early in 2021 sources indicated that SUSE was preparing for an IPO before summer with a projected value of 7-8 billion euros.
An official ITF (Intent to Float) statement was then released on April 26, 2021.
On May 19, 2021, SUSE went public at Frankfurt Stock Exchange at an original issue price of 30 euros, with EQT Partners retaining 75.7 percent. The headquarters of the newly formed SUSE S.A. was set to Luxembourg. Nürnberg remained the largest software development office though.

Acquisition of NeuVector
On 28 October 2021, SUSE announced that it had acquired NeuVector, Inc., a provider of full lifecycle container security, for $130 million in cash and stock.

Products

Starting with the launch of the SUSE Linux Enterprise 10 platform in July 2006, the SUSE Linux Enterprise 10 platform was the basis for both the server and desktop, with an almost identical code base.

, SUSE Linux Enterprise 15 is the latest available version.

Linux

Server
The primary server Linux distribution from SUSE is SUSE Linux Enterprise Server ("SLES") targeted to large organizations for physical, virtual and cloud workloads. All versions are available for multiple processor architectures, including Intel x86, ARM, AMD x86-64, IBM Power, IBM S/390 and z Systems, and Intel Itanium. SLES is available in both on-demand and bring-your-own-subscription ("BYOS") images on Amazon EC2, Microsoft Azure, and Google Compute Engine.

Offerings based on the Server product
 SUSE Linux Enterprise Server for SAP Applications, a Linux operating system optimized for SAP workloads
 SUSE Linux Enterprise Point of Service, a Linux operating system for the retail industry that includes a version of Linux tailored for user touch points and in-store servers
 SUSE Linux Enterprise High Performance Computing, an infrastructure solution for high performance computing
 SUSE Linux Enterprise High Availability Extension, an integrated suite of open source HA clustering and storage replication technologies

Special editions of the Server product
SUSE Linux Enterprise Server has several optimized editions created in the context of the respective partnerships. These editions are derived from the base Server product:
 SLES for VMware (entitlement was included in VMware vSphere; product end-of-availability has been announced)
 SLES for Amazon EC2
 SLES for Microsoft Azure, which includes a specially tuned kernel
 SLES for ARM Raspberry Pi support, a specially packaged version of SUSE Linux Enterprise Server for ARM, tailored for Raspberry Pi 3 Model B
 SUSE Linux Enterprise Real Time, a special version of SUSE Linux Enterprise Server that turns the general-purpose operating system into a real-time operating system

Desktop
 SUSE Linux Enterprise Desktop, the successor to Novell Linux Desktop
 SUSE Linux Enterprise Workstation Extension, an add-on extension that adds desktop features to the SUSE Linux Enterprise Server
 LibreOffice office productivity suite is also distributed by SUSE

Software-defined infrastructure
 SUSE OpenStack Cloud, an automated cloud computing platform based on OpenStack for deploying and managing Infrastructure-as-a-Service private clouds. SUSE announced that they would discontinue sales as of October 2019
 SUSE Enterprise Storage, a software-defined storage tool based on Ceph enabling the use of commodity servers and disk drives for cost-effective, resilient, and scalable storage. SUSE announced they would discontinue sales as of March 2021

Management
 SUSE Manager, a comprehensive Linux server management tool based on Uyuni (a fork of Spacewalk, based on SaltStack) for package and patch management, system provisioning and monitoring

Application delivery
 SUSE CaaS Platform ("Container as a Service"), an application development and hosting platform for container-based applications and services based on Kubernetes
 SUSE Cloud Application Platform, a platform-as-a-service environment based on Cloud Foundry and Kubernetes

References

External links
 

1992 establishments in Germany
2003 mergers and acquisitions
2019 mergers and acquisitions
Companies based in Nuernberg
Free software companies
Linux companies
Micro Focus International
Private equity portfolio companies
Remote companies
Software companies established in 1992
SUSE Linux